The 1st Annual Indonesian Movie Awards was held on December 15, 2007, at the Plenary Hall, Jakarta Convention Center, Central Jakarta, is the first year of implementation of Indonesian Movie Awards. The award show was hosted by Nirina Zubir, Luna Maya, Aming, and Ringgo Agus Rahman. And the nominations have been announced in the category of Favorite, which will be chosen by the public via SMS. The category of Best, will be selected by a jury that has been appointed.

The national films were registered from January 2005 to February 2007. Until the registration is closed, appeared 48 films of various genres. In total there are 16 categories contested. This category was divided into 8 best nominations of the jury selection and best 8 nominations of the viewers selection.

Berbagi Suami into a film with the most nominations this year's award, with eleven nominations. Mendadak Dangdut and Detik Terakhir follow behind, with the receiving of nine and seven nominations. Even get more than ten nominations, Berbagi Suami failed to win any of the awards. Mendadak Dangdut be biggest winner in this first award, taking home six trophies at once, followed by D'Bijis and Denias, Senandung Di Atas Awan behind with receiving two trophies each. While other films receiving one award each.

Nominees and winners

Best
Winners are listed first and highlighted in boldface.

Favorite
Winners are listed first and highlighted in boldface.

Film with most nominations and awards

Most nominations

The following film received most nominations:

Most wins
The following film received most nominations:

References

Indonesian
2007 in Indonesia
Indonesian
Indonesian Movie Actor Awards